Andrena denticulata   is a Palearctic species of mining bee.

References

External links
Images representing Andrena denticulata  

Hymenoptera of Europe
denticulata
Insects described in 1802